Wicker Park is a neighborhood in the West Town community area of Chicago, Illinois, west of the Kennedy Expressway, east of  Humboldt Park, and south of the Bloomingdale Trail, known for its hipster culture, art community, nightlife, and food scene.

Wicker Park has seen real estate and commercial development, particularly along the CTA Blue Line subway. It is home to many luxury boutique shops and several flagship stores including Adidas Originals, Champion, Arc'teryx, and  Yeti. Within the 60622 zip code, Wicker Park is home to some of Chicago's most expensive real estate with median home prices over $550,000.

Geography
The neighborhood is west of Pulaski Park, northwest of The Loop, north of East Village and Ukrainian Village, east of Humboldt Park, and south of Bucktown.  The 4 acre Chicago Park District, Wicker Park, is an outdoor gathering place in the neighborhood.

The borders of the Wicker Park neighborhood are generally accepted to be the Bloomingdale Trail (also known as the 606) to the north (~coordinate 1800 North), although historically it has ranged as far north as Armitage (~coordinate 2000 N) at times, Ashland Avenue to the east (~coordinate 1600 W), Division to the south (~coordinate 1200 N), and Western Avenue to the west (~coordinate 2400 W).

The Wicker Park Historic District is on the National Register of Historic Places listings in Chicago. Much of Wicker Park was also designated as a Chicago Landmark District.

History

19th century
In late 1868, the Chicago Board of Public Works announced the desire to build a park "lying west of Milwaukee avenue and south of North avenue. The grounds are of considerable capacity and are laid out in a tasteful and attractive manner as a park." Present at the meeting was alderman Charles Wicker, who, with his brother Joel, purchased  of land along Milwaukee Avenue in 1870 and laid out a subdivision with a mix of lot sizes surrounding a  park. The Great Chicago Fire of 1871 spurred the first wave of development, as homeless Chicagoans looked to build new houses.

Before the end of the 19th century, Germans and Norwegians tended to live in the area's north and northwestern sections. Wicker Park became the abode of Chicago's wealthy Northern European immigrants.  The district proved especially popular with merchants, who built large mansions along the neighborhood's choicest streets—particularly on Hoyne and Pierce, just southwest of North and Damen−known then as Robey.  Hoyne was known then as "Beer Baron Row", as many of Chicago's wealthiest brewers built mansions there.

Turn of the century
With the end of the 19th century the area was subsumed into the surrounding. Polish Downtown, being adjacent to Wicker Park (city park), which gave the neighborhood its name, also became known as the "Polish Gold Coast". In the 1890s and 1900s, immigration from Poland and the completion of the Metropolitan West Side Elevated Lines greatly boosted the population density of West Town, especially in areas east of Wicker Park. The area around Division, Milwaukee, and Ashland was once known as "Kostkaville", and the intersection retains the names "Polonia Triangle − Polish Triangle" to the present day.

20th century

The provisional government of Poland met in Wicker Park during World War I. The near Northwest Side became home to many of the most opulent churches in the Archdiocese of Chicago, built in the Polish Cathedral style of Renaissance Revival and Baroque Revival architecture in the Eastern U.S.

1930s–1950s
Polish immigration into the area accelerated during and after World War II when as many as 150,000 Poles are estimated to have arrived between 1939 and 1959 as Displaced Persons (DPs).  Like the Ukrainians in neighboring Ukrainian Village, they clustered in established ethnic enclaves like this one that offered shops, restaurants, and banks where people spoke their language. Division Street was referred to as Polish Broadway.  Poet John Guzlowski whose parents first came to the area as DPs commented on growing up in the area in the 1950s that "it felt like everyone was a Pole", a place where the local store owners, priests, cops, trash men, teachers, librarians all either spoke Polish or had family that did.

Nelson Algren's literary output lionized the Division Street strip in his books such as The Man with the Golden Arm and Never Come Morning focusing on the stories of junkies, gamblers, hookers, and drunks in some areas of that neighborhood. Writing about the area's Polish American underclass against the background of prevalent anti-immigrant xenophobia was taken by Poles as blatant Anti-Polonism and resulted in the book Never Come Morning being banned for decades from the Chicago Public Library system over the massive outcry by Chicago Polonia. Later controversies to commemorate Algren would bring these old wounds back to the surface, most recently when Polonia Triangle was to be renamed to honor the deceased author.

1960s–1970s
Beginning in the 1960s, Wicker Park began to change radically. Construction of the Kennedy Expressway, completed in 1960, had displaced many residents and torn holes in the sustaining network of Polish-American churches, settlement houses, and neighborhood groups. Additionally Puerto Ricans and other Latinos displaced by urban renewal in Old Town and Lincoln Park began moving in. In 1960 Latinos comprised less than 1 percent of West Town's population, but by 1970 that number was up to 39 percent. Split from the Lincoln Park neighborhood  by the Chicago River and then the Kennedy Expressway in the late 1950s and 60s, it contained the second largest concentration of Puerto Ricans in Chicago. It was the original home to the largest Latino gang at the time, the Latin Kings. The Young Lords, a human rights movement under the leadership of Jose Cha Cha Jimenez respectfully worked with the Latin Kings and held sit-ins with L.A.D.O. at the Wicker Park Welfare Office and large nonviolent marches to city hall with the Spanish Action Committee. Urban renewal projects were undertaken to combat "urban blight" in some parts of the neighborhood, but disinvestment continued at a rapid clip as downtown banks redlined West Town for much of the mid-20th century.

Wicker Park was also promoted by the city's urban renewal plans, as a good "suburb within the city" because of its easy access to downtown, via Milwaukee and the elevated train (via Damen and Division stations). Chicago and Wicker Park reached a nadir in the 1970s, a decade when the city overall lost 11% of its population. During the 1970s, hundreds of cases of insurance-motivated arson were reported in Wicker Park, near St. Elizabeth Hospital. Many small factories near the area (many in woodworking) also closed or moved away. The city increased building code enforcement and raised taxes. The shift from manufacturing to the new city sponsored service economy also increased unemployment in the area and it was now in a downward decline. North Avenue between Western Avenue & Milwaukee Avenue became notorious for prostitution and drug dealers and gang crimes. The setting now became feasible for the neighborhood associations to organize land grab tours of real estate and speculators and developers saw a gold mine. The entire Puerto Rican Community along with other low income residents were displaced.

1980s–1990s

Efforts by community development groups like Northwest Community Organization (NCO) to stabilize the community through new affordable-housing construction in the 1980s coincided with the arrival of artists attracted by the neighborhood's easy access to the Loop, cheap loft space in the abandoned factories, and distinctly urban feel.

In 1989, the "Around the Coyote" festival was launched to help the hundreds of working artists and micro-galleries in the neighborhood to gain a level of local and international prominence. This 501(c)3 non-profit was established with the mission to "bring to the art community a professional organization that will help artists network and exhibit their art." For decades, the festival centered on the Flatiron Arts Building and was typically held during the month of October, Chicago's Artist Month. Since 2008 "Around the Coyote" moved downtown, officially marking an end of an era,  in 2008 it was renamed  Looptopia. The presence of local artists also declined in the area, many migrated to other art communities in Pilsen, Humboldt Park, Logan Square, Jefferson Park, Rogers Park, and Uptown.

21st century

The present day neighborhood is best known for its numerous commercial and entertainment establishments, and being a convenient place to live for downtown workers due to its proximity to public transportation and The Loop. In 2001, MTV's reality TV show The Real World: Chicago was also staged in Wicker Park, which caused protests due to perceived promotion of gentrification. In the past two decades crime has decreased and many new homes have been built as well as older homes being restored, leading to increased business activity. The neighborhood is extremely trendy known for hosting emerging bands, high fashion boutiques, cutting-edge gourmet restaurants and bakeries, European-style cafes, upscale independent grocers,  and artsy businesses.

In a September 2012 Forbes article, Wicker Park was named the #4 hippest hipster neighborhood in the country. 

Wicker Park, along with other nearby West Town neighborhoods, has seen rising property values and increasing tax rates, increasing taxes levied by the city. In 2016 the city overall saw an average increase in taxes of 13%, when the city government raised the property tax rate and re-assessed housing values, however Wicker Park saw a 28.1% average increase. Nearby developments including the Bloomingdale Trail (otherwise known as The 606) have fueled an increase in property values and helped spur other large scale developments.

Education
Wicker Park residents are zoned to various schools in the Chicago Public Schools district.

 A. N. Pritzker School, formerly the Wicker Park School, is a performing arts-magnets school in the neighborhood which serves elementary and middle school students. Additionally, Sabin Dual Language School and Lasalle II are also located in the neighborhood.
 Sabin Dual Language Magnet School is a dual language magnet school.
 Jonathan Burr Elementary School serves Kindergarten through 8th grade families.
 LaSalle II Magnet School is a magnet school modeled after LaSalle World Language Academy.

Culture

Residents
Notable past and current residents include:
 Nelson Algren, local author, lived on the 3rd floor of 1958 West Evergreen Avenue 1959–1975
 Colt Cabana, professional wrestler 
 CM Punk, professional wrestler
 Hannibal Buress, comedian
 Carrie Coon and Tracy Letts, actors

Notable past and current musicians who have/now live or work in Wicker Park include: 
 Liz Phair, singer-songwriter, penned her first album Exile in Guyville in Wicker Park
 James Iha, guitarist of the band Smashing Pumpkins
 Matt Skiba, singer/guitarist of The Alkaline Trio.
 Also: Wilco, Tim Kinsella, Joan of Arc (band), Mike Kinsella, Naked Raygun, Tortoise, Pegboy, Veruca Salt, Urge Overkill, Eleventh Dream Day, Trenchmouth, The Jesus Lizard, and Stephanie O'Brien.

Media
In 2001 a season of MTV's The Real World, named The Real World: Chicago, was filmed in Wicker Park.  A protest grew, as residents of the neighborhood felt the exposure may lead to a quicker gentrification of the neighborhood.  While the protest began somewhat tongue-in-cheek, it soon intensified and there were 11 arrests by the time the cast of the show left the city.

Wicker Park is the setting of the 2004 film of the same name. However, the filming of this movie was done on location in Montreal, Quebec. Another film of note, that used Wicker Park as its background, is High Fidelity (2000) directed by Stephen Frears and starring Evanston-born John Cusack.

In 2015, a portion of the Spike Lee movie Chiraq was being filmed at Double Door on Milwaukee in Wicker Park, including rapper actor Nick Cannon.

In 2016, the Chicago-based TV show Shameless filmed across Wicker Park.
The NBC Chicago franchise including Chicago Fire, Chicago P.D., and Chicago Med often film in Wicker Park.

Milwaukee Avenue's Irazu Costa Rica Restaurant has been featured on PBS television's Check, Please!, Food Network's Diners, Drive-ins and Dives when Guy Fieri sampled several dishes, and Food Network's The Secret Life of Milkshakes.  The burritos competed in ESPN's FiveThirtyEight's 2014 Burrito Bracket.

See also

 Wicker Park (Chicago park)
 National Register of Historic Places listings in West Side Chicago
 Poles in Chicago
 
 Shuga Records
 West Town, Chicago
 Young Lords

References

External links
Wicker Park Committee 

1870 establishments in Illinois
Historic districts in Chicago
Neighborhoods in Chicago
Polish-American culture in Chicago
Populated places established in 1870
West Side, Chicago
Hipster neighborhoods